St. Paul's Church and Cemetery is a historic Episcopal church in Paris Hill, Oneida County, New York. It was built in 1818 and is a rectangular timber framed Federal style structure measuring 36 feet by 50 feet.  It features a one-stage belfry rising from the roof.  Located adjacent is the parish cemetery with burials dating from the early 19ths century to the present day.

It was listed on the National Register of Historic Places in 1996.

References

External links
 

Churches on the National Register of Historic Places in New York (state)
Cemeteries on the National Register of Historic Places in New York (state)
Episcopal church buildings in New York (state)
Federal architecture in New York (state)
Churches completed in 1818
19th-century Episcopal church buildings
Churches in Oneida County, New York
Cemeteries in Oneida County, New York
National Register of Historic Places in Oneida County, New York